Emanuel J. "Mutt" Evans (May 2, 1907 – February 8, 1997) was an American businessman and the first Jewish mayor of Durham, North Carolina. He served a then-record six terms from 1951-1963.

Early life

Evans was born in Plainfield, New Jersey on May 2, 1907. He was the son of Isaac Evans and Sarah (Newmark) Evans and brother of Monroe Evans. Evans moved to North Carolina to attend the University of North Carolina at Chapel Hill, where he met Sara Nachamson, a student at nearby Duke University and daughter of retailers Eli and Jenny Nachamson, who owned the United Dollar Stores Company. Evans and Nachamson married on June 19, 1928, in Durham, where they settled, taking over the day to day business of United Dollar Stores.

Race relations
Shortly after the end of World War II, the company, now Evans' United Department Stores, became the first business on Durham's Main Street to contain restrooms for African Americans, and was the site of the only integrated lunch counter in Durham. At some point in the early 1950s, Durham County Judge 'Bus' Borland ordered Evans to build a wall to separate white customers from African-American customers, in order to comply with North Carolina legal statutes. Evans responded by telling the Judge that, "you'll have to close the store, if you want me to do that", before his lawyer pointed out that the specific statutes only applied to seated lunch counters. Evans removed the seats from the counter and raised the countertop to elbow height.

Mayoral accomplishments
In 1951, Evans, a Democrat, became Durham's first Jewish mayor in an historic election that also saw women elected to the city council for the first time: Kathrine Robinson Everett and Mary Duke Biddle Trent. Contrary to expectations that Christian southerners would be biased against a Jewish candidate, Evans highlighted his leadership of his synagogue in his campaign, believing that his devotion to his religion would be respected. As mayor, Evans led a coalition of blacks, whites, liberals and labor. His first campaign called for the rejection of “prejudice and bigotry,” and he overwhelmingly received the black vote by margin of twenty to one.
During his record six terms as mayor, serving until 1963, Evans oversaw the desegregation of Durham's schools, public agencies and Police and Fire Departments.

Selling the stores
In 1961, after it became apparent that neither of the Evans' sons, Bob nor Eli, were interested in assuming the responsibility of managing Evans United Department Stores Company, Evans sold the chain of six stores to Belk.

References

Politicians from Plainfield, New Jersey
Jewish mayors of places in the United States
University of North Carolina at Chapel Hill alumni
Mayors of Durham, North Carolina
1907 births
Jewish American people in North Carolina politics
1997 deaths
20th-century American politicians
20th-century American Jews